The 1880 CCNY Lavender football team represented the City College of New York during the 1880 college football season.

Schedule

References

CCNY
CCNY Beavers football seasons
College football winless seasons
CCNY Lavender football